Glabroculus is a Palearctic genus of butterflies  in the family Lycaenidae.

It contains two species:

 Glabroculus cyane (Eversmann, 1837) Urals, Turan, Tian-Shan, Ghissar, Darvaz, Pamirs-Alai, Saur, Tarbagatai, South Altai, Transbaikalia, Mongolia. 
 Glabroculus elvira (Eversmann, 1854) Kazakhstan, Kyrgyzstan.

References

Polyommatini
Lycaenidae genera